Jairoud (also spelled Jerud or Jayroud) is a city in southern Syria, administratively part of the Rif Dimashq Governorate, located northeast of Damascus in the Qalamoun Mountains. Nearby localities include ar-Ruhaybah, al-Qutayfah and Muadamiyat al-Qalamoun to the southwest, Yabroud, an-Nabek and Deir Atiyah to the north and al-Qaryatayn to the northeast. According to the Syria Central Bureau of Statistics, Jairoud had a population of 24,219 in the 2004 census. The city is also the administrative center of the Jairoud nahiyah which consists of four towns and villages with a combined population of 31,821. Its inhabitants are predominantly Sunni Muslims.

History
Excavations at the site produced microliths, blades, scrapers and other lithic tools dating back to the Natufian culture.

During Roman times, Jairoud was known as Geroda. The city is mentioned in the Antonine Itinerary which was written during the reign of Diocletian. In the itinirary the city is one of the stations on the Roman road between Palmyra and Damascus, and is at a distance of 16 Roman miles from Telsea (modern Al-Dumayr).

Jairoud was visited by Syrian geographer Yaqut al-Hamawi in the early 13th-century, during Ayyubid rule. He noted that it was "a village of Ma'loula in the Ghautah of Damascus."

Under the Ottomans, the city served as the centre of the Jairoud Nahiyah, and was the seat of a Pasha (Mohammed Aldaas Jairoudi Pasha) and an Agha (Saleem Aldaas Agha) In the 19th century, the city was described as affluent, hospitable and "unusually clean." The city was attacked frequently by Bedouin tribes that live on the edge of the Syrian Desert.

Geography
The city lies on the ancient merchant caravan route between Damascus and Palmyra, in the fertile plain of Jairoud on the foothills of the Qalamoun Mountains. The land is well-cultivated and is known for its produce of wheat and barley. The city lies to the western end of a large salt marsh called, "al-Mallahah".

References

Bibliography

 
 

 

Populated places in Al-Qutayfah District
Natufian sites
Neolithic sites in Syria
Archaeological sites in Rif Dimashq Governorate
Cities in Syria